Lomié is a town in the Lomié District in the Upper Nyong division of the East Province of Cameroon. An article in the Mail & Guardian Online describes it as having "no telephone connection to the outside world, and a single access road that is little more than a forest trail". 
In fact Lomié has been connected to the cellular phone network since 2006 and the town has had several 'boom' periods. While previous employment came from the logging industry currently the town is near an important cobalt and zinc mining project. The GEOVIC mining company uses Lomié as a base.
Lomié has a number of interesting historical buildings, dating from the German and French era. Among these building are the house of the senior civil administrator, a jail, a courthouse and a post-office. The town used to be center of the Upper Nyong Division until it was replaced by Abong-Mbang. 
Roads from Lomié lead north to Abong-Mbang via Mindourou, east to Messok and Yokadouma and south to Ngoila.

Lomié is situated in the immediate periphery of the Dja Faunal Reserve, Cameroon's only UNESCO World Heritage Site. The town attracts occasional tourism because of the reserve. A number of small guesthouses and small hotels exist.

See also 
 Communes of Cameroon
 Baka (nomadic Central African people)
 Nzime
 Dja Biosphere Reserve

External links 
 Mail & Guardian Online article: For Cameroon's pygmies, no forest is impenetrable enough
 Pictures of Lomié

Populated places in East Region (Cameroon)